Bangladesh–Denmark relations are foreign relations between Bangladesh and Denmark. Denmark has an embassy in Dhaka. Bangladesh is represented through its embassy in Stockholm, Sweden.

Development assistance
Bangladesh has been part of the Danish development assistance since its independence in 1971. Danish development helps Bangladesh with transport, water transport, agriculture, fisheries and rural development.

Denmark supports human rights and civil society in Bangladesh.

Agreements 
In 1975, an agreement on boat building and mechanization was signed.
In 1978, both countries signed an agreement on a fish marketing scheme.

See also 
 Foreign relations of Bangladesh    
 Foreign relations of Denmark

References

External links
 Denmark keen to increase cooperation in energy sector Bangladesh Sangbad Sangstha (BBS)

 
Denmark
Bilateral relations of Denmark